Gymnastes is a genus of crane fly in the family Limoniidae.

Species
Subgenus Gymnastes Brunetti, 1911
G. anticaniger Alexander, 1967
G. dilatipes Alexander, 1956
G. hyalipennis (Alexander, 1920)
G. latifuscus Alexander, 1967
G. omeicola Alexander, 1935
G. ornatipennis (de Meijere, 1911)
G. shirakii (Alexander, 1920)
G. subnudus Alexander, 1956
G. teucholaboides (Alexander, 1920)
G. tridens Alexander, 1967
G. violaceus Brunetti, 1911
Subgenus Neogymnastes Alexander, 1971
G. perexquisitus Alexander, 1938
Subgenus Paragymnastes Alexander, 1922
G. berumbanensis Edwards, 1928
G. bistriatipennis Brunetti, 1918
G. catagraphus Alexander, 1929
G. clitellarius Alexander, 1937
G. comes Alexander, 1966
G. cyanoceps (Alexander, 1922)
G. dasycerus Alexander, 1948
G. demeijerei (Riedel, 1921)
G. fascipennis (Thomson, 1869)
G. flavitibia  (Alexander, 1919)
G. fulvogenualis Alexander, 1937
G. gloria (Alexander, 1921)
G. hylaeus Alexander, 1932
G. imitator Alexander, 1951
G. kandyanus Alexander, 1958
G. maya Alexander, 1958
G. mckeani Alexander, 1935
G. multicinctus Edwards, 1931
G. nigripes (Alexander, 1922)
G. nigripes Edwards, 1928
G. niveipes Alexander, 1948
G. pennipes Brunetti, 1918
G. pictipennis Edwards, 1916
G. riedeli (Alexander, 1931)
G. simhalae Alexander, 1958

References

Limoniidae
Nematocera genera
Taxa named by Enrico Adelelmo Brunetti